Tuur Dierckx (born 9 May 1995) is a Belgian professional footballer who plays as a striker for Belgian First Division A club Westerlo.

Club career
Dierckx made his debut on 26 July 2013 in the first game of the 2013–14 season against Charleroi. He replaced Lior Refaelov after 81 minutes as Club Brugge won the game 2–0.

Dierckx signed for Antwerp in 2016.

Career statistics

Club

Honours
Club Brugge
 Belgian First Division: 2015–16
 Belgian Cup: 2014–15
Westerlo

 Belgian First Division B: 2021–22

References

External links 

1995 births
Living people
Belgian footballers
Belgium under-21 international footballers
Belgium youth international footballers
Association football forwards
Belgian Pro League players
Club Brugge KV players
Royal Antwerp F.C. players
S.K. Beveren players
K.V.C. Westerlo players